Selenophanes is a genus of Neotropical butterflies.

Species
Unknown species group
Selenophanes cassiope (Cramer, [1775])
Selenophanes supremus Stichel, 1901
The josephus species group
Selenophanes josephus (Godman & Salvin, [1881])

References

Morphinae
Nymphalidae of South America
Nymphalidae genera
Taxa named by Otto Staudinger